Paul Émile Lecaron (29 July 1863 – 17 September 1940) was a French tennis player. He competed in the men's singles and doubles events at the 1900 Summer Olympics.

References

External links
 

1863 births
1940 deaths
French male tennis players
Olympic tennis players of France
Tennis players at the 1900 Summer Olympics
Sportspeople from Neuilly-sur-Seine